Yevgenyevka is the name of several rural localities in Russia:
Yevgenyevka, Belgorod Oblast, a selo in Gubkinsky District of Belgorod Oblast
Yevgenyevka, Kursk Oblast, a selo in Azarovsky Selsoviet of Kastorensky District of Kursk Oblast
Yevgenyevka, Novosibirsk Oblast, a village in Tatarsky District of Novosibirsk Oblast